Henry Salmon (14 March 1910 – 30 July 1944) was an English footballer who played in the Football League for Millwall, Southport, and Stoke City.

Career
Salmon was born in Fenton and played with local clubs Stoke St Peter's, Longton Hall and Macclesfield Town before joining Stoke City in 1932. He played three matches for Stoke scoring once in a 4–0 win against Oldham Athletic in the 1932–33 season as Stoke won the Second Division title. He left at the end of the season for London club Millwall and suffered relegation. He returned north to play for Wellington Town, Southport and Shrewsbury Town.

Later life
Salmon served in World War II, being killed in action in the battle for Caen during the Normandy campaign on 30 July 1944, aged 34, and was buried at Fontenay-le-Pesnel War Cemetery (section II.C18), Tessel, Calvados, France. Then a sergeant in the 1/7th battalion of the Royal Warwickshire Regiment, he left a wife, Doris. He is commemorated as 'Harry Salmon' by the Commonwealth War Graves Commission.

Career statistics
Source:

Honours
Stoke City
 Football League Second Division champions: 1932–33

References

1910 births
1944 deaths
People from Fenton, Staffordshire
English footballers
Association football defenders
Macclesfield Town F.C. players
Stoke City F.C. players
Millwall F.C. players
Telford United F.C. players
Southport F.C. players
Shrewsbury Town F.C. players
English Football League players
Royal Warwickshire Fusiliers soldiers
British Army personnel killed in World War II
Military personnel from Staffordshire